The 12271 / 72 Lucknow New Delhi Duronto Express was a Superfast Express train of the Duronto Express category belonging to Indian Railways - Northern Railway zone that runs between Lucknow NR and New Delhi in India. It was replaced by Lucknow Rajdhani Express, which was then replaced by Lucknow-New Delhi AC Superfast Express for everyday run.

It operates as train number 12271 from Lucknow NR to New Delhi and as train number 12272 in the reverse direction serving the states of Uttar Pradesh & Delhi.



Coaches

The 12271 / 72 Lucknow New Delhi Duronto Express presently has 1 AC First Class, 2 AC 2 tier, 4 AC 3 tier, 4 AC 3 tier Economy & 2 End on Generator Car. It does not carry a Pantry car coach.

As is customary with most train services in India, Coach Composition may be amended at the discretion of Indian Railways depending on demand.

Service

The 12271 Lucknow New Delhi Duronto Express covers the distance of 493 kilometres in 08 hours 00 mins (61.63 km/hr) & in 07 hours 40 mins as 12272 New Delhi Lucknow Duronto Express (64.30 km/hr).

As the average speed of the train is above , as per Indian Railways rules, its fare includes a Superfast Express surcharge.

Routeing & Technical Halts

The 12271 / 72 Lucknow New Delhi Duronto Express used to run from Lucknow NR to New Delhi with a 10-minute technical halt at Moradabad Jn.

Traction

As the route was not fully electrified, it used to be powered by a Tuglakabad-based WDM 3A for its entire journey.

Timings

12429(number changed) Lucknow New Delhi Duronto Express leaves Lucknow NR daily at 23:30 hrs IST and reaches New Delhi at 07:25 hrs IST the next day.

References

External links

Duronto Express trains
Passenger trains originating from Lucknow
Rail transport in Delhi
Railway services introduced in 2010